Zd or ZD may refer to:

 Nissan ZD engine, an automobile engine
 Zero Defects, a management program to eliminate defects in industrial production, popular in American industry in the late 1960s
 Zero-defects mentality, in which a command-and-control structure does not tolerate mistakes
 Zertifikat Deutsch, a certificate of German language ability
 Ziff Davis, a magazine publisher and Internet information provider
 Zooey Deschanel, an American actress and musician